Hypulia is a genus of moths in the family Geometridae described by Swinhoe in 1894.

Species
Hypulia dirempta (Walker, 1861) India, Singapore 
Hypulia continua (Walker, 1861) Borneo, Peninsular Malaysia (Penang), Sumatra, Andamans 
Hypulia strictiva Prout, 1932 Borneo 
Hypulia eleuthera Holloway, 1993 Peninsular Malaysia, Singapore, Borneo, possibly Sumatra 
Hypulia convoluta Holloway, 1993

References

Baptini